The 52nd Rolex 24 at Daytona was an endurance sports car racing event held at the Daytona International Speedway, Daytona Beach, Florida, from 23–26 January 2014.  The 52nd running of the 24 Hours of Daytona was also the inaugural race for the Tudor United SportsCar Championship as well as the newly merged International Motor Sports Association (IMSA) sanctioning body.  As part of the new series, Le Mans Prototype and Le Mans GT Endurance-style cars were eligible to participate for the first time in over a decade.

The race was won by Action Express Racing, who led a sweep of the top four positions for Corvettes in the Prototype category.  Brazilian Christian Fittipaldi and Portuguese João Barbosa became two-time race winners, while Frenchman Sébastien Bourdais won his first Rolex 24 after holding off the Wayne Taylor Racing Corvette by a second and a half at the finish.  The GTLM was won by Porsche North America, whose 911 RSR beat out the Team RLL BMW.  The Prototype Challenge category was led by CORE Autosport ahead of 8Star Motorsports.  The GTD class victory was originally awarded to the Flying Lizard Motorsports Audi following a post-race penalty for Level 5 Motorsports' Ferrari, but IMSA later rescinded the penalty, promoting the Ferrari to first place in class.

An incident marred the race during its third hour when Memo Gidley's GAINSCO Corvette ran into the back of the slowed Risi Ferrari of Matteo Malucelli.  Officials halted the race for approximately one hour while both drivers were extracted from their cars.  Both were held at Halifax Medical Center for several days.

Race

Race result

References

24 Hours of Daytona
Daytona
Daytona
24 Hours of Daytona